Mawsillu was a Turcoman tribe active in Aq Qoyunlu and the Safavid Empire.

History 
According to Turkish historian Tufan Gündüz and John E. Woods, they one of the three biggest tribes dominating Aq Qoyunlu along with Purnak and Bayandur tribes. Their main controlled areas were near Diyarbakr and Erivan. They supported Hamza beg (a son of Qara Yuluq Osman) and Sheykh Hasan at earliest times but later changed their allegiance to Uzun Hasan after 1451 during Aq Qoyunlu succession crisis. They acquired the city of Ruha in later in 1475 following the defeat of Uways (brother of Uzun Hasan).

After the conquests of Ismail I they were important players in the Qizilbash administrative structure with Ismail twice marrying into the tribe and his successor, Shah Tahmasp I being born to a Mawsillu mother.

Famous members 

 Begtash beg Mawsillu — founder of the clan.
 Osman (d. 1436)
 Muhammad (d. 1451)
 Amir I (d. 1473) — Commander in Chief of Aq Qoyunlu army, governor of Shiraz
 Hasan
 Gulabi I (d. 1491, killed by Suleyman beg Bijan) — Governor of Erzinjan
 Qayitmaz (d. 1507)
 Amir II (d. 1522) — Governor of Erzinjan, Guardian of Tahmasp I
 A daughter — married to Ruzagi family
 Sharafkhan Bidlisi
 Marjumak (d. 1528)
 Ma'sum (d. 1528)
 Gulabi II (d. 1528)
 Ibrahim (d. 1528) — Governor of Baghdad, killed by Zulfaqar beg
 Malik Qasim (d. 1529)
 Muhammadi (foster brother of Tahmasp I)
 Ali beg (or Nokhud Sultan)
 Zulfaqar (d. 1529) — Captured Baghdad from Ibrahim and submitted to Ottomans, but was on the orders of Tahmasp I
 Ali — killed Zulfaqar on the orders of Tahmasp I
 Ismail
 Fulad
 Sufi Khalil (d. 1491, killed by Suleyman beg Bijan)— Governor of Shaki and Shiraz, regent of Baysonqor
 Jamshid (d. 1491)
 Shaykh Ali (d. 1492)
 Ismail (d. 1496)
 Yusuf
 Begtash
 Ya'qub
 Nur 'Ali
 Pir Umar
 Qutb al-Din
 Hamza beg
 Mihmad beg
 Tajlu Khanum — Consort of Ismail I, mother of Tahmasp I
 Bakr (d. 1491, killed by Suleyman beg Bijan) — Governor of Astarabad
 Isa beg
 Musa beg — Governor of Azerbaijan
 Sultanum Begum — Consort of Tahmasp I, mother of Mohammad Khodabanda and Ismail II

References 

Mawsillu